Aleksandr Moiseyev may refer to:
 Aleksandr Moiseyev (basketball), Russian basketball player
 Aleksandr Alekseyevich Moiseyev, officer of the Russian Navy
 Alex Moiseyev, Soviet-born American draughts player